Sherwood Alfred Cheney (August 24, 1873 – March 13, 1949) was an American military engineer who served as a brigadier general in the US Army Corps of Engineers during World War I and as an aide to President Calvin Coolidge.

Early life and education 

Born to industrialist John Sherwood Cheney and Ellen (Coates) Cheney on August 24, 1873, Sherwood Cheney was a member of the Cheney silk manufacturing dynasty of Manchester, Connecticut, where he was born and raised. He graduated from Hartford Public High School in 1892 and studied for one year at the Sheffield Scientific School before transferring to the US Military Academy at West Point, from which he graduated as a member of the Class of 1897.

Military career 
Cheney entered the US Army Corps of Engineers as a second lieutenant and saw combat in Cuba and the Philippines during the Spanish–American War and the Philippine–American War. His cousin, Lieutenant Ward Cheney, was killed in action during the latter conflict. He rose through the ranks, achieving captain in 1904, major in 1911, lieutenant colonel and colonel in 1917, and brigadier general in 1918. Reverting to colonel after the war, he retired a brigadier in 1937. 

During World War I, Cheney commanded the 110th Engineer Regiment at Fort Sill (August 1917 – April 1918) and in France (May–July 1918). He subsequently served at General Headquarters as assistant to the chief engineer of the American Expeditionary Forces from July to November 1918, helping organize the Corps and coordinate its efforts with the other service branches. In 1919, he served as director of the Army Transport Service, "achieving remarkable results in a task of great magnitude involving the expeditious return of many thousands of soldiers from the ports of France to the United States," according to his citation for the US Army Distinguished Service Medal. In addition to this American honor, France awarded him the Croix de Guerre and made him a Commandeur of the Legion of Honour. 

Following World War I, Cheney served as military attaché to China and Siam from 1921 to 1924, commanded the Army Engineer School at Fort Humphreys from 1924 to 1925, and served as a chief military aide to President Calvin Coolidge from 1925 to 1928. He then held various district engineering commands around the country until he retired, including service as chief engineer of the Port of Boston and head of the 9th Coast Artillery District in San Francisco.

Personal life and legacy 
In 1921, Cheney married Louise Delano (1891–1923), a daughter of Frederic Adrian Delano and cousin of Franklin Delano Roosevelt. The couple had one daughter, Matilda. Following his first wife's death in China in 1923, Cheney married Charlotte S. Hopkins (1885–1978) of Bangor, Maine, in 1925. 

Returning to Manchester after retirement, Cheney built a summer home in Mystic and became an enthusiastic sailor. He was one of the founders of Mystic Seaport. 

Cheney died at home in Manchester at the age of 75 and is buried in the Cheney family plot of Manchester's East Cemetery. 

The Cheney Elementary School in Fairfax County, Virginia, was named in his honor.

References 

1873 births
1949 deaths
People from Manchester, Connecticut
United States Military Academy alumni
American military engineers
United States Army generals
American military personnel of the Spanish–American War
American military personnel of the Philippine–American War
Recipients of the Distinguished Service Medal (US Army)
Commandeurs of the Légion d'honneur
Recipients of the Croix de Guerre 1914–1918 (France)
United States Army generals of World War I
Military personnel from Connecticut
United States Army Corps of Engineers personnel